Beauty & the Beast is a platform game written by Wendell Brown for the Intellivision and released on December 31, 1982 by Imagic. It is a single-player game with a concept similar to Nintendo's Donkey Kong.

Gameplay
In the game, the player takes the role of Bashful Buford who must save Tiny Mabel from the giant Horrible Hank. In order to save Tiny Mabel, the player must climb up a building while avoiding things thrown by Horrible Hank. Hearts come from Mabel which makes Buford invincible for a short time. Once the player saves Mabel, the giant dies by falling off the building.

Intellivision Lives! released an emulated version of the game bundled with B-17 Bomber and Shark! Shark!

Reception
In How to Win at Home Video Games, the reviewer wrote: "Beauty and the Beast is actually Imagic's answer Donkey Kong'''s theme, 'climb the building to save the girl.' Surprising, however, it's a beauty of a game that we recommend to video beasts of all skill levels."

It was also reviewed by TeleMatch and Tilt''.

Legacy
In 2018, a remake was announced for the Intellivision Amico.

References

1982 video games
Imagic games
Intellivision games
Intellivision-only games
Video games developed in the United States
Single-player video games